Phaedropsis flavipennis is a moth in the family Crambidae. It was described by William James Kaye in 1901. It is found in Trinidad.

References

Spilomelinae
Moths described in 1901